Ragwŏn station (Pohyang station) is a railway station in Ragwŏn 1-dong, Sinŭiju, North P'yŏngan Province, North Korea. It is on located on the P'yŏngŭi Line of the Korean State Railway.

References

Railway stations in North Korea
Buildings and structures in North Pyongan Province
Sinuiju